Lifea Blinec is an album by Muhal Richard Abrams which was released on the Arista Novus label in 1978 and features performances by Abrams, Joseph Jarman, Douglas Ewart, Amina Claudine Myers and Thurman Barker.

Reception
The Allmusic review states "Muhal Richard Abrams headed one of his finest small combos on this intense quintet session from 1978".

Track listing
All compositions by Muhal Richard Abrams
 "Bud P. (Dedicated To Bud Powell)" - 7:52
 "Lifea Blinec" - 10:02
 "Ja Do Thu (Dedicated To Jarman, Douglas & Thurman)" - 8:19
 "Duo 1" - 8:18
 "Duo 2" - 5:01
Recorded at Gravado Streeterville Recording Studio in Chicago, February, 1978

Personnel
Muhal Richard Abrams: piano, percussion, conductor
Joseph Jarman: bass saxophone, bassoon, alto clarinet, flute, soprano saxophone, percussion, vocals
Douglas Ewart: bass clarinet, soprano clarinet, bassoon, alto saxophone, tenor saxophone, percussion
Amina Claudine Myers: piano
Thurman Barker: drums, percussion

References

1978 albums
Muhal Richard Abrams albums
Novus Records albums